Valle di Campo is a side-valley of the Valle Maggia, canton of Ticino, Switzerland. The valley has few small villages/hamlets.

Valleys of Ticino
Lepontine Alps